Mirabi is a musical art form that was developed in South Africa in the middle 1950s.

History
It is often characterized as music indigenous of the South African region mixed with American big band jazz.  Mirabi music is often thought to have been created as a social protest against South Africa's Apartheid.  Mirabi was just one part of black South African culture that created conflict between Apartheid officials and the black community.  A good example of this sentiment can be seen in a song called "Sip n' Fly".  Written by musician Ntemi Piliso,  considered one of several founders of Mirabi, the song is a humorous song that talks about how to sneak alcohol past the Apartheid police.

South African styles of music